The Leicestershire Police and Crime Commissioner is the police and crime commissioner, an elected official tasked with setting out the way crime is tackled by Leicestershire Police in the English counties of Leicestershire and Rutland. The post was created in November 2012, following an election held on 15 November 2012, and replaced the Leicestershire Police Authority. The current incumbent is Rupert Matthews, who represents the Conservative Party.

List of Leicestershire Police and Crime Commissioners

2021 election

2016 election

2012 election

References

Police and crime commissioners in England